Chawia is a settlement in Kenya's Taita-Taveta County.

References 

Populated places in Coast Province
Taita-Taveta County